The 2004 LSU Tigers football team represented Louisiana State University in the 2004 NCAA Division I-A football season.  Coached by Nick Saban in his final season coaching at LSU, the Tigers played their home games at Tiger Stadium in Baton Rouge, Louisiana. The team finished with a 9–3 record and an appearance in the Capital One Bowl against Iowa.

Schedule

2004 LSU Tigers Football Schedule

Roster and Coaches

Rankings

Game summaries

Oregon State

Arkansas State

at Auburn

at Florida

Alabama

vs. Iowa (Capital One Bowl)

LSU Tigers in the 2005 National Football League Draft

References

LSU
LSU Tigers football seasons
LSU Tigers football